Mungeli district is a district of Chhattisgarh, India, with headquarters in Mungeli. It was carved out of Bilaspur district in 2013. The present collector of Mungeli is Shri Rahul Dev.

The story of Netflix movie Chaman Bahaar is based in Mungeli district. The story revolves around a young man who runs a paan thela on a semi-deserted road, after Mungeli district was carved out of Bilaspur district. Actor Jitendra Kumar plays the lead role.

Mungeli has three tehsils: Mungeli, Lormia and Patharia.

Demographics 

As of the 2011 census, the population was 701,707, of which 65,439 (9.33%) live in urban areas. The population growth rate over the decade 2001-2011 was 38.29%. 1,20,631 (17.19%) are under 6 years of age. Mungeli has a sex ratio of 974 females per 1000 males and a literacy rate of 64.75%. Scheduled Castes and Scheduled Tribes make up 27.70% and 10.37% of the population respectively.

As of the 2011 census, 97.25% of the population spoke Chhattisgarhi and 1.45% Hindi as their first language.

References

 
Districts of Chhattisgarh
States and territories established in 2012